Some Rap Songs is the third studio album by American rapper Earl Sweatshirt. It was released on November 30, 2018, through Tan Cressida Records and distributed by Columbia Records.

The album features guest contributions from Navy Blue, Standing on the Corner, as well as vocal samples of Earl's mother Cheryl Harris, Earl's father Keorapetse Kgositsile who is credited posthumously, and an instrumental sample of Hugh Masekela, who is also credited posthumously. It features prominent production from Sweatshirt himself, with further contributions by Darryl Anthony, Adé Hakim, Denmark, Black Noise, Sage Elsesser and Shamel of SOTC.

Cover art
The cover of Some Rap Songs is a shaky, blurry selfie of Earl smiling, "blurred beyond any easy identification". The facial features shown in the photograph have been noted: the staff of Atwood Magazine wrote that "The photo's details are still vaguely discernible, namely Earl's blurry face and floating, penetrating eyes", and Dylan Green of DJBooth highlighted the "teeth stacked together in a terrifying smile below glaring eyes."

Several commentators have compared the album's blurry cover photograph with the music itself. Israel Daramola of Spin called it "an apt visual metaphor for the music itself, both in the image of a spark of life amidst chaos, and in the sense that the creative process of taking the photo may have been ruptured as it was happening." Atwood Magazine stated that the album "sounds how this picture looks—unpredictable yet calculated, blurry and distorted yet well-defined". Green wrote of the album's tracks that "The bars and the beats clash in a way befitting" of the cover photograph, and The A.V. Clubs Clayton Purdom wrote that "That blurry cover and demurring title are no feint; [Earl is] buried in the mix, his voice fighting against crashing waves of old jazz samples and the cut-up shades of long-gone voices."

Release and promotion 
Some Rap Songs was released on November 30, 2018. On January 30, 2019, Earl uploaded an eight-minute short film titled Nowhere, Nobody in promotion of the album, featuring different songs from the album throughout the video.

Singles 
The album's lead single, "Nowhere2go", was released on November 8, 2018. The album's second single, "The Mint" featuring Navy Blue, was released on November 20, 2018.

Critical reception

Some Rap Songs was met with widespread critical acclaim. At Metacritic, which assigns a normalized rating out of 100 to reviews from mainstream publications, the album received an average score of 86, based on 19 reviews. Aggregator AnyDecentMusic? gave it 8.0 out of 10, based on their assessment of the critical consensus.

Reviewing the album for The A.V. Club, Clayton Purdom stated: "Well, it can be [dour]. But it's also ecstatic. Make no mistake: This is an album by one of the best rappers alive, elbowing slant rhymes and assonance into his disses ("Please do aboard, I could feel when you're forcin' it / Still in a bore riddim") and exhaling those singularly oblong sentences of his ("Galaxy's the distance between us by Christmas," he describes one floundering relationship)." Fred Thomas of AllMusic wrote: "Simultaneously sad, strange, and warmly nostalgic, Some Rap Songs is excitingly listenable and emotionally connected despite its abstruse approach. The album's triumphs are in its fearless risk taking and the insight it allows into the journey of Earl Sweatshirt's constant creative regeneration". Pitchforks Timmhotep Aku said, "The project is distinctly rough around the edges, to great effect; there's the sound of dust popping off vinyl and cassette hiss throughout. ... His uncle and father are gone, but Earl is still here, carrying on their artistic legacy—and, with the help of his collaborators, building his own".

Sputnikmusic wrote, "Every loop [of "Nowhere2go"] reveals another layer to the undulating beat, but for the first time thus far it's Earl taking the spotlight, rising above the track with a tired yet hopeful rap that's so melodic he's nearly singing. And in case you were worried the boy wouldn't spit, it's followed quickly by "December 24", a song dating back years under the name "Bad Acid" which provides the strongest link to the more aggressive and conventional early 2010s Earl". Daniel Spielberger of HipHopDX praised the album saying, "Some Rap Songs is reminiscent to Earl's late friend Mac Miller's final album Swimming. Both bring the listener through the process of overcoming trauma and healing but ultimately, choose to leave the story unfinished". XXL critic Chris Gibbons said, "Some Rap Songs packs a lot in 25 minutes, making for an unsettling listen that is also one of the most personal, gripping rap records of the year".

Charles Holmes of Rolling Stone stated, "Some Rap Songs is the rare album by an immensely talented lyricist who deigns not to pull out any fireworks, opting to sink into the cushion's of a therapist's couch in the search for an honest work of art. It's a delicate statement of restraint, and in this case the process shows more of the artist than ever before". NMEs Sam Moore enjoyed the album, saying, "Some Rap Songs may be a brief exercise, but its ambition and the—largely successful—execution of its ideas demonstrate that the enigmatic Earl is as fascinating as ever". M. T. Richards of Exclaim! said, "Although a very strong record for what it is, Some Rap Songs lacks the emotional power of the two albums that preceded it, particularly Doris, which charted Earl's transition back to civilian life from a Samoan wilderness camp".

Rankings

Track listing

Sample credits
  "Shattered Dreams" contains samples from "Shattered Dreams" as performed by The Endeavors and written by John Thomas Jr.
  "Cold Summers" contains a sample of "Road Man (Mystic)" as performed by Mighty Flames and written by Willy N'For, Emmanuel Baloka and Jimmy Stormy.
  "Ontheway!" contains samples from "Trust in Me Baby" as performed by Soul Superiors and written by Sherman Willis.
 "The Mint" contains a sample from the film Black Dynamite.
  "The Bends" contains a sample from "After Loving You" as performed by Linda Clifford and written by Lowrell Simon and Richard Tufo.
  "Azucar" contains a sample from "I'm Just a Shoulder to Cry On" as performed by The Soul Children and written by Donald Davis, Harvey Scales and Albert Vance.
  "Veins" contains a sample from "I Made a Mistake" as performed by Billy Jones and written by Curtis Mayfield.
 "Playing Possum" contains vocal samples from "UCLA Law Keynote" as spoken by Cheryl Harris, and an excerpt of "Anguish Longer Than Sorrow", a poem written and spoken by Keorapetse Kgositsile.
  "Riot!" contains a sample from "Riot" as performed and written by Hugh Masekela.

Personnel
Credits were adapted from the album's liner notes.

 Thebe Kgositsile – engineering, mixing, vocals
 Shamel of SOTC – mixing engineering, bass guitar on "Ontheway!" and “Riot!”
 Mike Bozzi – mastering engineering

Charts

Release history

Notes

References

External links
Nowhere, Nobody on YouTube

2018 albums
Columbia Records albums
Sony Music albums
Albums produced by Earl Sweatshirt
Earl Sweatshirt albums
Hip hop albums by American artists